Pianotarium: Piano Tribute to Metallica is a piano tribute album to heavy metal band Metallica by Scott D. Davis. It contains eight piano covers of Metallica songs and three original compositions. Davis had been a Metallica fan since his teenage years; explaining the genesis of the album to the Sacramento News & Review, he said: "I’ve been a huge Metallica fan since I was 14, and have wanted to do this album for a long time. I had a hunch that their music could sound really amazing on the piano. There’s a great deal of beauty in Metallica’s music, and I wanted the piano arrangements to highlight that quality, to bring forth many of the harmonies and intricacies that have always set Metallica apart. I also tried to take advantage of the powerful, edgy resonance of the grand piano, so that it wouldn’t totally lose its 'metal' intensity."

Track listing
 "Enter Sandman" – 5:39
 "Until It Sleeps" – 4:27
 "Master of Puppets" – 8:44
 "The Unforgiven" – 6:06
 "Welcome Home (Sanitarium)" – 6:23
 "Nothing Else Matters" – 6:02
 "One" – 6:17
 "Fade to Black" – 6:49
 "The Renewal - I - Lament" – 2:28
 "The Renewal - II - Inner Battle" – 3:50
 "The Renewal - III - Return to Sanity" – 3:53

See also
 Metallic Assault: A Tribute to Metallica
 Metallic Attack: The Ultimate Tribute

References

2007 albums
Metallica tribute albums